Niels Albert (born 5 February 1986 in Bonheiden, near Antwerp, Belgium) is a former professional cyclo-cross racing cyclist who currently resides in Tremelo. He became World Champion twice, in 2009 and 2012.

Career 
Similarly to Sven Nys, Albert began BMX racing, in which he was two times Belgian National Champion, before switching to cyclo-cross. On 8 October 2006 Albert took his first major senior victory at Grote Prijs Pro Cycling Neerpelt, Belgium. Albert won the first International cyclo-cross of the 2007/08 season with a victory in Erpe-Mere, Belgium. Albert scored another big victory with the Superprestige in Gieten, the Netherlands where riding for the first time in the Elite category of the annual Gieten race, he beat Sven Nys and Lars Boom.

He finished second at the 2008/09 Belgian Cyclo-cross Championships (behind Sven Nys).

In 2009, he became the Cyclo-cross world champion in Hoogerheide, The Netherlands. He took a second World Champion title in 2012, after a solo victory in Koksijde.

His career ended abruptly on 19 May 2014, when Albert, aged 28, announced his retirement as a professional cyclist, due to heart problems.

Major results

Road

2007
 3rd Overall Boucles de la Mayenne
2009
 1st Stage 1 Mi-Août Bretonne
 1st Prologue Boucles de la Mayenne
 4th Overall Tour Alsace
1st Stages 2 & 5
2010
 5th Overall Circuito Montañes
1st Stage 6
2011
 1st Stage 2 Tour Alsace
 7th Overall Boucles de la Mayenne
2013
 8th Ronde van Limburg

Cyclo-cross

2003–2004
 1st  UCI World Junior Championships
 1st  UEC European Junior Championships
 1st  National Junior Championships
 1st Overall Junior Superprestige
1st Ruddervorde
1st Gieten
1st Diegem
1st Hoogstraten
1st Harnes
1st Vorselaar
2nd Gavere
2004–2005
 1st Overall Under-23 Superprestige
1st Gavere
1st Gieten
1st Hoogstraten
1st Vorselaar
2nd Sint-Michielsgestel
3rd Ruddervorde
3rd Diegem
 UCI Under-23 World Cup
1st Hofstade
 1st Under-23 Kalmthout
 1st Under-23 Beuvry
 1st Under-23 Leudelange
 2nd  UEC European Under-23 Championships
 2nd National Under-23 Championships
 3rd Zonnebeke
2005–2006
 1st  UEC European Under-23 Championships
 1st  National Under-23 Championships
 1st Overall Under-23 Superprestige
1st Ruddervorde
1st Sint-Michielsgestel
1st Gavere
1st Gieten
1st Diegem
1st Hoogstraten
1st Vorselaar
 1st Overall Under-23 Gazet van Antwerpen
1st Koppenberg
1st Loenhout
1st Lille
 UCI Under-23 World Cup
1st Kalmthout
 Gazet van Antwerpen
2nd Niel
3rd Baal
 1st Under-23 Pijnacker
 2nd Aalter
 2nd Antwerpen
 2nd Dottenijs
 2nd Eeklo
 3rd  UCI World Under-23 Championships
2006–2007
 1st  UEC European Under-23 Championships
 1st  National Under-23 Championships
 1st  Overall UCI Under-23 World Cup
1st Kalmthout
1st Hofstade
1st Nommay
2nd Hoogerheide
 1st Overall Under-23 Superprestige
1st Sint-Michielsgestel
1st Gavere
1st Gieten
1st Hamme
1st Diegem
1st Hoogstraten
1st Vorselaar
2nd Ruddervorde
 2nd Overall Gazet van Antwerpen
1st Oostmalle
1st Loenhout
3rd Baal
 1st Antwerpen
 1st Neerpelt 
 2nd  UCI World Under-23 Championships
 2nd Eeklo
 2nd Vossem
 2nd Mechelen
 3rd Overijse
 3rd Aalter
2007–2008
 1st  UCI World Under-23 Championships
 1st  UEC European Under-23 Championships
 1st  Overall UCI Under-23 World Cup
1st Kalmthout
1st Hofstade
1st Liévin
1st Hoogerheide
 3rd Overall Superprestige
1st Gieten
1st Hoogstraten
1st Vorselaar
2nd Veghel-Eerde
 Gazet van Antwerpen
1st Lille
1st Oostmalle
3rd Loenhout
3rd Hasselt
 1st Ardooie
 1st Erpe-Mere
 2nd Neerpelt
 2nd Lebbeke
 2nd Mechelen
 3rd National Championships
 3rd Eeklo
2008–2009
 1st  UCI World Championships
 UCI World Cup
1st Tábor
2nd Kalmthout
2nd Pijnacker
 Superprestige
1st Veghel-Eerde
2nd Vorselaar
2nd Hoogstraten
3rd Ruddervorde
 Gazet van Antwerpen
1st Lille
2nd Oostmalle
2nd Niel
3rd Koppenberg
3rd Baal
 1st Erpe-Mere
 1st Zonhoven 
 1st Ardooie
 1st Eeklo
 1st Mechelen
 1st Tervuren
 2nd National Championships
 3rd Dottenijs
2009–2010
 2nd Overall UCI World Cup
1st Treviso
1st Plzeň
1st Nommay
1st Hoogerheide
2nd Igorre
2nd Heusden-Zolder
3rd Kalmthout
 2nd Overall Superprestige
1st Diegem
1st Hoogstraten
1st Gavere
2nd Ruddervorde
2nd Vorselaar
3rd Gieten
 3rd Overall Gazet van Antwerpen
1st Namur
1st Essen
2nd Loenhout
2nd Koppenberg
3rd Baal
3rd Hasselt
 1st Ardooie
 1st Erpe-Mere
 1st Maldegem
 1st Neerpelt
 1st Overijse
 1st Dottenijs
 1st Eernegem
 2nd Mechelen
 3rd Bredene
2010–2011
 1st  National Championships
 1st  Overall UCI World Cup
1st Koksijde
1st Igorre
1st Hoogerheide
2nd Heusden-Zolder
2nd Aigle
2nd Pontchâteau
3rd Plzeň
 Superprestige
1st Diegem
2nd Hoogstraten
3rd Hamme
3rd Gavere
 Gazet van Antwerpen
1st Loenhout
1st Oostmalle
2nd Koppenberg
3rd Baal
 Fidea Classics
1st Tervuren
2nd Niel
 3rd Asteasu
 3rd Bredene
 3rd Cauberg
 3rd Mechelen
2011–2012
 1st  UCI World Championships
 Superprestige
1st Ruddervorde
1st Zonhoven
1st Diegem
 Gazet van Antwerpen
1st Loenhout
1st Oostmalle
2nd Essen
3rd Ronse
 1st Kalmthout
 1st Dottenijs
 1st Mechelen
 UCI World Cup
2nd Namur
 Fidea Classics
2nd Niel
3rd Neerpelt
 2nd National Championships
 3rd Cauberg
2012–2013
 1st  Overall UCI World Cup
1st Plzeň
2nd Rome
2nd Heusden-Zolder
2nd Koksijde
3rd Namur
3rd Tábor
3rd Roubaix
 1st Overall Bpost Bank Trophy
1st Oostmalle
1st Lille
1st Loenhout
1st Ronse
2nd Koppenberg
2nd Hasselt
3rd Baal
3rd Essen
 2nd Overall Superprestige
1st Diegem
2nd Hamme
2nd Zonhoven
2nd Middelkerke
2nd Ruddervorde
 Soudal Classics
1st Leuven
1st Niel
2nd Neerpelt
3rd Antwerpen
 1st Dottenijs
 1st Heerlen
 1st Cincinnati
 2nd National Championships
 2nd Bredene
 2nd Kalmthout
 2nd Overijse
 2nd Sint-Niklaas
 2nd Mechelen
 3rd Ardooie
 3rd Maldegem
2013–2014
 2nd Overall Superprestige
1st Hamme
1st Gieten
2nd Zonhoven
3rd Diegem
3rd Hoogstraten
 2nd Overall Bpost Bank Trophy
1st Oostmalle
2nd Hasselt
3rd Baal
3rd Loenhout
3rd Essen
3rd Ronse
 3rd Overall UCI World Cup
1st Koksijde
1st Rome
3rd Namur
 Soudal Classics
1st Neerpelt
1st Antwerpen
 1st Sint-Niklaas
 1st Erpe-Mere
 2nd Ardooie
 2nd Dottenijs
 3rd Maldegem
 3rd Mechelen

See also 

 Niels Albert CX

References 

 UCI World Cyclo-cross Championships Archive

External links 

1986 births
Living people
Belgian male cyclists
Cyclo-cross cyclists
People from Bonheiden
UCI Cyclo-cross World Champions (men)
Cyclists from Antwerp Province
Belgian cyclo-cross champions
21st-century Belgian people